Captain Arthur Wellesley "Dooley" Briscoe MC (6 February 1911 – 22 April 1941) was a South African cricketer who played in two Tests, one in 1935–36 and the other in 1938–39.

Briscoe was born at Johannesburg, Transvaal, and was educated at King Edward VII School. A batsman, he played domestic first-class cricket for Transvaal from 1931–32 to 1939–40, scoring six centuries.

He played in two Test matches, making his début in the second Test against the touring Australian cricket team at his home ground, Old Wanderers in Johannesburg, in December 1935. Despite having achieved some success in domestic cricket, he scored only 15 and 16, and he was dropped for the remainder of the five-match series. He played his second Test against the touring MCC team in the drawn second Test at Newlands, Cape Town in December 1938/January 1939. He was out for two, and was dropped again.

He played his last first-class match in January 1940. He joined the 1st Battalion of the Transvaal Scottish Regiment, and served in East Africa alongside fellow cricketers Bruce Mitchell and Ronnie Grieveson, fighting the Italians in Somaliland and Abyssinia. He was awarded the Military Cross for his actions in Huberta and Ionte (Yoontoy) in Italian Somaliland, and was killed in action near Dessie in Ethiopia.

References

External links

Profile from CricketArchive

1911 births
1941 deaths
South Africa Test cricketers
South African cricketers
Gauteng cricketers
South African military personnel killed in World War II